James Ewing may refer to:
James Ewing (pathologist) (1866–1943), American pathologist and oncologist
James D. Ewing (1917–2002), American newspaper publisher, government reform advocate and philanthropist
James Eugene Ewing, American evangelist associated with St. Matthew's Churches
James Caruthers Rhea Ewing (1854–1925), American missionary to India
James Alfred Ewing (1855–1935), Scottish physicist and engineer
James Arthur Ewing (born 1916), 40th Governor of American Samoa
James Ewing (Pennsylvania politician) (1736–1806), American colonial-era politician
James Ewing (MP) (1784–1852), Member of Parliament for Wareham, 1830–1831
James Ewing of Strathleven (1775–1853), Member of Parliament for Glasgow, 1832–1835 and co-founder of the Glasgow Necropolis
James Stevenson Ewing (1835–1918), American lawyer and diplomat

See also
Jamie Ewings (born 1984), Scottish footballer